Space Opera is a 2018 science fiction novel by Catherynne Valente, about a galactic version of the Eurovision Song Contest. It was first published by Saga Press.

Synopsis
In order to join galactic civilization — rather than be declared non-sentient, and subsequently eradicated  — humanity must participate in the Metagalactic Grand Prix, an interspecies music contest. Winning is not necessary, as long as the participants are not ranked last. However, when the alien emissaries supply a list of suggested musicians, the only entry on the list to not be dead or otherwise physically incapable of performing is Decibel Jones and the Absolute Zeroes, a washed-up, burnt-out glam rock trio with only two surviving members.

Reception
Space Opera was a finalist for the 2019 Hugo Award for Best Novel. and for the 2019 Campbell Memorial Award for Best Science Fiction Novel.

Kirkus Reviews found it "charming", albeit "(l)ight on plot and originality", and drew parallels to Rick and Morty and the works of Daniel Pinkwater. Publishers Weekly praised Valente's "effervescent prose (as) wildly creative and often funny", while conceding that the novel's "frequent tangents can make for chaotic reading." In the Financial Times, James Lovegrove noted its "ripe satiric potential", but also its "somewhat meagre plot". The Guardian called it an "over-the-top, absurdist extravaganza" with a "frantic narrative" and "pertinent observations about diversity and gender politics".

Origin
Valente has described the book as the result of having been publicly dared, by one of her Twitter followers, to write a science fiction / fantasy version of Eurovision; an editor then offered to buy such a novel from her, sight unseen.

Sequel
In 2019, Valente announced that she was working on a sequel, to be titled Space Oddity.

Film Adaptation
As of September 2018, Space Opera was under development as a movie.

References

2018 science fiction novels
2018 American novels
American science fiction novels
Novels by Catherynne M. Valente
Novels about music
Eurovision Song Contest
Saga Press books